Patrick, Paddy or Pat Burke may refer to:

Patrick B. Burke (born 1984), Democratic politician from New York
Patrick Burke (bishop) (1779–1843), bishop of Elphin from 1827 to 1843
Patrick Burke (Clare politician) (1879–1945), Irish politician from Clare
Patrick Burke (cricketer) (born 1919), Trinidadian cricketer
Patrick Burke (Dublin politician) (1904–1985), Irish politician from Dublin
Patrick Burke (defensive back) (born 1968), Canadian football player
Patrick Burke (golfer) (born 1962), American golfer
Patrick F. Burke (1934–2011), American football player, businessman
Paddy Burke (born 1955), Irish Fine Gael party politician from County Mayo, Senator since 1993
Paddy Burke (Australian footballer) (1898–1953), Australian rules footballer
Paddy Burke (Gaelic footballer) (1921–1955), Irish Gaelic footballer
Paddy Burke (hurler) (born 1995), Irish hurler
Pat Burke (baseball) (1901–1965), MLB player
Pat Burke (born 1973), Irish basketball player
Pat Burke (association footballer) (1892–?), English footballer
Pat Burke (Gaelic footballer), Irish Gaelic footballer
Patrick E. Burke (1830–1864), lawyer, Missouri state legislator, and Civil War officer